Piazza della Repubblica may refer to:
 Piazza della Repubblica (Alcamo)
 Piazza della Repubblica, Rome
 Piazza della Repubblica, Florence